The 2000 Thai Premier League consisted of 12 teams.  The bottom club would be relegated to the Thailand Division 1 League. The club that came 11th would play in a relegation / promotion match against the club that came second in the Thailand Division 1 League.

Champions Royal Thai Air Force entered the next edition of the Asian Club Championship.

The league was also known as the Caltex Premier League.

Member clubs

Bangkok Bank
Bangkok Metropolitan Administration
BEC Tero Sasana
Krung Thai Bank
Osotsapa M-150
Port Authority of Thailand
Royal Thai Air Force
Royal Thai Navy (promoted from Division 1)
Royal Thai Police (promoted from Division 1)
Sinthana
Thai Farmers Bank
TOT

Final league table

Promotion and relegation playoff

The club that came 11th in the Thai Premier League was to play in a relegation / promotion match against the runner-up in the Thailand Division 1 League, but at the end of the season, Thai Farmers Bank dropped out of the league and folded.

As such, Sinthana, the club that came 11th, took their place, while TOT, the team that came 12th, would play in the relegation / promotion match.

March 27 and March 31, 2001

† TOT remain in the Thai Premier League.

Season notes

Thai Farmers Bank would withdraw from the league at the end of the season due to the Asian financial crisis that initial struck in 1998. The effects would spread across Asia and many clubs now came under a huge financial burden.

Queen's Cup

Bangkok Bank won the 27th edition of the Queen's Cup and their third title overall. They defeated Sinthana 5–3 on penalties after a 2–2 draw played at Suphachalasai Stadium.

Thailand FA Cup

BEC Tero Sasana won their first Thailand FA Cup. It is unclear whom they beat in the final.

Asian Representation

 Royal Thai Air Force  would progress to the second round of the 2000–01 Asian Club Championship, but only on the virtue of receiving a bye in the first round. Here, they would get beat once again by PSM Ujungpandang of Indonesia.
 BEC Tero Sasana reached the Quarter-finals of the 2000–01 Asian Cup Winners Cup, where they were beaten by Shimizu S-Pulse of Japan in a match played over two legs. They drew the first leg at home, but were overcome in Japan.

Annual awards

Coach of the Year

 Pichai Pituwong - BEC Tero Sasana

Player of the year

 Anurak Srikerd - BEC Tero Sasana

Top scorer

 Sutee Suksomkit - 16 Goals Thai Farmers Bank

Champions
The league champion was BEC Tero Sasana. It was the team's first title.

References

Thailand 2000 RSSSF

External links
Official Website

Thai League 1 seasons
Thailand
Thailand
1